Ala Bridge is a historic bridge in Turkey. It is still in use.

Geography
The bridge is in Anamur ilçe (district) of Mersin Province. Alaköprü Dam is to the north of the bridge.

History
The bridge was constructed by the Karamanids. Karamanids were a Turkmen beylik which were the main rivals of the Ottomans in Anatolia up to the end of the 15th century. (see Anatolian Beyliks) In the 14th century they dominated most of the Mediterranean coast. They constructed the bridge to control Anamur in the coast from Ermenek a city in the mountains. But there is no inscription on the bridge and exact construction date is unknown.

Architecture 
The bridge is an arch type bridge. Main arch is a  arch. There is also a minor arch next to the main arch which acts as a discharging cell during heavy rain fall.

References

Buildings and structures in Mersin Province
Anamur District
Arch bridges in Turkey
Bridges completed in the 14th century
Karamanids
Anatolia Beyliks bridges
Deck arch bridges